FK Zvezdara is a football club based in Zvezdara, Belgrade, Serbia. They compete in the Serbian League Belgrade, the third tier of the national league system.

History
The club was founded on 10 March 1951 as FK Bulbulderac. They spent the following decade competing in the local leagues of Belgrade. In 1960, the club changed its name to BSK and continued playing in the lower leagues for another decade. They would change their name to OFK Zvezdara in 1974.

After the breakup of Yugoslavia, the club started to climb up the national league pyramid, gaining promotion to the third tier in 1993. They spent the next two seasons in the Serbian League North (1993–94 and 1994–95), placing second and third respectively. Following the assassination of its president Miodrag Nikšić in July 1995, the club finished second in the newly formed Serbian League Belgrade in the 1995–96 season and earned promotion to the Second League of FR Yugoslavia.

The club played in the Second League for five seasons between 1996 and 2001, narrowly missing promotion on two occasions (1997–98 and 1998–99). They eventually won first place in Group East in the 2000–01 season and took promotion to the First League for the first time in history. However, after the murder of its president Branislav Trojanović in July 2001, the club went through an ownership crisis. As a result, they were promptly relegated from the top flight, finishing 16th out of 18 in their debut appearance. The club eventually merged with Srem, which continued to compete in the 2002–03 Second League of Serbia and Montenegro.

Shortly after the club's folding, a group of supporters created a new club called FK Bulbulderac, continuing the tradition of the former club. They gained promotion to the Belgrade First League in 2007 and later to the Belgrade Zone League in 2010. On 12 July 2013, the club changed its name to FK Zvezdara. After spending eight seasons in the fourth tier, they earned promotion to the Serbian League Belgrade in 2018.

Honours
Second League of FR Yugoslavia (Tier 2)
 2000–01 (Group East)

Seasons

Notable players
This is a list of players who have played at full international level.
  Mitar Novaković
  Ivica Kralj
  Marko Dević
  Ranko Stojić
For a list of all FK Zvezdara players with a Wikipedia article, see :Category:FK Zvezdara players.

Managerial history

References

External links
 
 Club page at Srbijasport

1951 establishments in Serbia
2002 establishments in Serbia
Association football clubs established in 1951
Association football clubs established in 2002
Football clubs in Serbia
Football clubs in Belgrade
Zvezdara
Phoenix clubs (association football)